Nicole Schammel is an American ice hockey forward currently playing for the Minnesota Whitecaps of the Premier Hockey Federation (PHF).

Career 
Schammel began her university career with Minnesota State University, but after only year there, she decided to transfer to the University of Minnesota. Across 152 NCAA games, she scored 113 points and was named a finalist for the Patty Kazmaier Memorial Award in 2019.

On June 6, 2019, Schammel signed her first professional contract with the Minnesota Whitecaps of the Premier Hockey Federation (PHF). In her first PHF season, Schammel put up 25 points in 22 games, 12th highest in the league. She was named to Team Dempsey for the 2020 NWHL All-Star Game.

In September 2020, she announced that she was joining the Professional Women's Hockey Players Association (PWHPA) for the 2020–21 season. She participated with the Minnesota regional team in the PWHPA's exhibition games against the United States Premier Hockey League's junior Minnesota Mullets, with the PWHPA team winning by scores of 8–1 and 9–3.

On October 7, 2021, Schammel re-signed with the Minnesota Whitecaps.

International 
Schammel participated in the 2012 and 2013 USA Hockey Girls U-18 Select Development Camps, but has yet to play a game for the American national team.

Career statistics

References

External links
 

Minnesota Whitecaps players
1996 births
Living people
People from Red Wing, Minnesota
American women's ice hockey forwards
Ice hockey players from Minnesota
Professional Women's Hockey Players Association players
21st-century American women
Minnesota Golden Gophers women's ice hockey players
Premier Hockey Federation players